The following is a list of statewide initiatives and referendums modifying state law and proposing state constitutional amendments in Missouri, sorted by election.

2000s

2004

2006

2010s

2018

2020s

2020

References

Missouri ballot measures
Constitution of Missouri